Ganapati Ram is an Indian politician.  He was elected to the Lok Sabha, the lower house of the Parliament of India from the Machhlishahr, Uttar Pradesh as a member of the Indian National Congress.

References

External links
Official biographical sketch in Parliament of India website

1926 births
Possibly living people
Lok Sabha members from Uttar Pradesh
India MPs 1952–1957
India MPs 1957–1962
India MPs 1962–1967
Indian National Congress politicians